Louis Frank Drucke (December 3, 1888 – September 25, 1955) was a professional baseball pitcher. He played all or part of four seasons in Major League Baseball with the New York Giants from 1909 to 1912. As a pitcher, he won 18 while losing 15 games, with a 2.90 earned run average. As a batter, he hit .178 with one home run.

Drucke was the first major leaguer who attended and played at Texas Christian University (TCU).

External links 

Major League Baseball pitchers
New York Giants (NL) players
Dallas Giants players
Toronto Maple Leafs (International League) players
Oakland Oaks (baseball) players
Venice Tigers players
San Francisco Seals (baseball) players
Minneapolis Millers (baseball) players
Baseball players from Texas
Sportspeople from Waco, Texas
1888 births
1955 deaths